DZSR (918 AM), on-air as Radyo Pilipinas Dos (RP2), is a radio station owned and operated by the Philippine Broadcasting Service, an attached agency under the Presidential Communications Office. The station's studio is located at 4th floor, Media Center Building, Visayas Avenue, Barangay Vasra, Diliman, Quezon City, and its transmitter is located at Malolos, Bulacan. DZSR operates daily from 6:00 AM to 8:00 PM or after the PBA games.

As the country's first radio station dedicated to sports, Radyo Pilipinas 2's programming grid is 70% sports content and 30% news, informative, and lifestyle programming carried over from DZRM Radyo Magasin. On September 18, 2017, Sports Radio was rebranded as Radyo Pilipinas 2, merging its programming with Radyo Magasin.

It is also the home of the radio coverage of the Philippine Basketball Association since the 1980s to 2000s, until its return in January 2023 along with selected Radyo Pilipinas provincial stations.

History

DZSR was formerly known as DPI Radyo Maynila during martial law. On May 10, 1986, Sports Radio (first known as DZSR SportsCenter 738) was established under the leadership of former actor Jose Mari Gonzales who took over as the Interim Director of the Bureau of Broadcast Services (former name of PBS). Gonzales ordered that all BBS radio station will give their respective identities including Radyo ng Bayan (918 kHz), Radyo Maynila (1278 kHz, now silent) and DZRP-Radyo Pagasa. DZFM was converted at that time as a news and information station covering sports developments in the country.

Before DZFM was rebranded as Sports Radio, it was then-known as Radio Sports which is just a segment of the government radio station DZFM. Reynaldo "Dado" Roa was the first station manager, and at the time, the first staff of DZFM was composed of sports writers and reporters from the Radio Sports department and radio newscasters of the said station. DZFM, later renamed their call letters to DZSR on 738 kHz, however the station's callsign was reverted to DZFM as a courtesy to the original owner of the frequency, Frederick Marquardt, an American national who donated the 738 kHz frequency to the Philippine government.

On January 2, 1995, Sports Radio's frequency was moved from 738 kHz (now occupied by Radyo ng Bayan) to 918 kHz and changed their call letters back to DZSR under Memorandum Order No. 329. (Presidential Order No. 293) On March 1, 1996, 5 years after Marquardt's death, and later to Cesar Soriano and his placed by the broadcast.

On February 1, 2010, it changed its callsign to DWSY (wherein the "SY" means Sports & Youth), as they expanded their programming from sports-related shows to youth-oriented programs. The youth programs of DWSY named "Youth Service" usually air on Saturdays. At the end of 2010, DWSY has changed back to DZSR.

On September 18, 2017, Sports Radio was rebranded as Radyo Pilipinas 2, merging its programming with Radyo Magasin, which was shut down permanently the previous day (The 1278 frequency is now being used as DepEd Radio). Initially, it was planned to be rebranded as Radyo Pilipinas 3, but turned out to be for the shortwave service counterpart.

In March 2020, Radyo Pilipinas 2 temporarily off-the-air amid the community quarantine imposed in Metro Manila due to COVID-19.

On March 7, 2022, Radyo Pilipinas 2 returned on air.

See also 
 DWGT-TV
 People's Television Network

References

Radio stations in Metro Manila
Radio stations established in 1971
People's Television Network
Philippine Broadcasting Service
Philippine Basketball Association mass media
Sports radio stations